The Mira-Bhayandar Municipal Transport (MBMT) is a public transport service owned by the Mira Bhayandar Municipal Corporation (MBMC), which commenced operations in 2006 as a local bus services connecting interconnecting various places in the Mira-Bhayandar area. Presently, these buses are run by a private company Kestrel Infrastructure Pvt. Ltd. Kestrel will pay a royalty of Re 1 per kilometer to the MBMT.
Presently MBMT operates in Mira-Bhayander, Thane, Borivali, Uttan and Andheri. Its fleet consists of non-AC TATA Marcopolo CNG buses and a handful of Volvo AC buses.

MBMT Bus Routes 
The following is a list of the limited bus routes operated by MBMT in Mumbai.

See also 
BEST Bus
Navi Mumbai Municipal Transport
Vasai-Virar Municipal Transport (VVMT)
Thane Municipal Transport (TMT)

References 

Municipal transport agencies of India
Companies based in Mumbai
Transport in Mira-Bhayandar
2006 establishments in Maharashtra
Indian companies established in 2006
Transport companies established in 2006